Joey is an English language unisex given name, used for both males and females. It can be a short form of:
 Joseph, for males
 Joel, for males
 Josiah, for males
 Joshua, for males
 Josephine, for females
 Joanna, for females
 Joanne for females 
 Joan, for females

People with the given name Joey

Male 
 Joey Banes (born 1967), American football player
 Joey Batey (born 1989), British actor and musician
 Joey Benjamin (1961–2021), English cricketer
 Joey Bishop (1918–2007), entertainer
 Joey Blount (born 1998), American football player
 Joey Buttafuoco (born 1956), American criminal
 Joey Cape (born 1966), lead singer of California punk band Lagwagon
 Joey Castillo (born 1966), musician
 Joey Chestnut (born 1983), competitive eater
 Joey Cora (born 1965), baseball player
 Joey Deacon (1920–1981), author and television personality
 Joey DeMaio, heavy metal bass guitarist and songwriter and jazz, rap, ballet dancer
 Joey Diaz (born 1963), Cuban-American stand-up comedian
 Joey Dunlop (1952–2000), motorcyclist
 Joey de Leon (Born 1946)  Filipino comedian
 Joey Fatone (born 1977), singer/actor
 Joey Gallo (born 1993), American baseball player
 Joey Galloway (born 1971), NFL wide receiver
 Joey Gase (born 1993), American NASCAR driver
 Joey Gathright (born 1981), baseball player
 Joey Graceffa (born 1991), YouTube star 
 Joseph Grimaldi (1778–1837), performed as "Joey The Clown"
 Joey Harrington (born 1978), former NFL quarterback
 Joey Ivie (born 1995), American football player
 Joey Janela (born 1989), American professional wrestler
 Andrew Johns ("Joey" Johns, born 1974), Australian rugby footballer
 Joey Jones, footballer and Wrexham FC coach
 Joey Jordison (1975–2021), drummer of Slipknot, guitarist of Murderdolls
 Joey Kramer (born 1950), drummer and percussionist for Aerosmith
 Joey LaMotta (1925–2020), American boxing manager
 Joey Lawrence (born 1976), actor
 Joey Logano (born 1990), NASCAR driver
 Joey Mazzarino (born 1968), puppeteer
 Joey Mbu (born 1993), American football player
 Joey McIntyre (born 1972), American actor and singer-songwriter, member of the group "New Kids on the Block"
 Joey Porter (born 1977), American football player for the Miami Dolphins
 Joey Ramone (1951–2001), vocalist and songwriter for the Ramones
 Joey Slye (born 1996), American football player
 Joey Smallwood (1900–1991), first premier of Newfoundland
 Joey Tempest (born 1963), vocalist and songwriter for the band Europe
 Joey Travolta (born 1950), American actor and filmmaker
 Joey Votto (born 1983), baseball player
 Joey Wagman (born 1991), American-Israeli baseball player
 Joey Wendle (born 1990), baseball player

Female
 Joey Lauren Adams (born 1968), American actress
 Joey Heatherton (born 1944) American dancer, actress and singer
 Joey King (born 1999), American actress
 Joey Kirkpatrick (born 1952), American glass artist, sculptor, wire artist, and educator
 Joey Yung (born 1980), Hong Kong singer and actress
 Joey Martin Feek, one-half of the country music duo Joey + Rory

Fictional people with the name Joey
 Joey, a character in 1989 American independent coming of age comedy movie She's Out of Control
 Joey, a character from the animated sitcom Daria
 Joey, from the 2018 Japanese manga series Chainsaw Man
 Joey Claire, from Hiveswap
 Joey Donovan, a character on the American television sitcom Gimme a Break
 Joey Evans, the main character from Pal Joey
 Joey Gladstone, from the sitcoms Full House and Fuller House
 Joey Harris, a character in the American television sitcom My Two Dads
 Joey Jeremiah, from the Degrassi series
 Joey Lucas, from the television drama The West Wing
 Joey Mallone, one of the main characters from the videogame Blackwell
 Joey Del Marco, a character in the Netflix series Grand Army
 Joey Potter, from the television drama Dawson's Creek
 Joey Russo, from the television sitcom Blossom
 Joey Stivic, from the television sitcom All in the Family
 Joey Tribbiani, a leading character in Friends and the title role of the TV series Joey
 Joey, from the French comedy animated television series Oggy and the Cockroaches
 Joey Washington, a character in the 1997 American martial arts comedy movie Beverly Hills Ninja
 Joseph "Joey" Wheeler (Katsuya Jonouchi in Japanese version), from Yu-Gi-Oh! Duel Monsters
 Joselito/Joey a character in Palibhasa Lalake portrayed by Joey Marquez

English feminine given names
English given names
English-language feminine given names
English-language masculine given names
English masculine given names
English unisex given names
Feminine given names
Hypocorisms
Masculine given names
Unisex given names